Dacotah Field is an outdoor stadium in the north central United States, on the campus of North Dakota State University (NDSU) in Fargo, North Dakota. It is the former home of the NDSU Bison football team.

Dacotah Field opened in 1910, north of Festive Hall on campus. A quarter-mile cinder track and a 7,000-seat stadium were added in 1938 as part of one of the federal government's Works Progress Administration (WPA) construction projects; it had a final seating capacity of 13,000.

The field moved farther north in 1949 to its present location, completed in time for the 1950 season. A 1952 fire destroyed two-thirds of the north stands but, in 1972, the remaining wooden bleachers were replaced with a new 7,000-seat grandstand, courtesy of the New England Patriots. NDSU won its final game at Dacotah Field in 1992 and still uses the turf for practice and high school games. In 1993, the team moved to the 18,700-seat Fargodome, adjacent to the north.

In 2013, the NDSU women's soccer team moved from Ellig Sports Complex to Dacotah Field. Major renovations were completed prior to the move, including new bleacher seating, lighting, sound system, and scoreboard; its seating capacity was reduced to 2,600 during the renovations.

In 2014, a $1 million project added a roof to enable year-round use as a multi-use event and practice facility. The air-supported structure hosted its first football practice on December 1, and new artificial turf was installed in the summer of 2017.

References

External links
Dacotah Field history
NDSU Campus Building Directory

North Dakota State Bison football
Defunct college football venues
Sports venues in North Dakota
Buildings and structures in Fargo, North Dakota
1910 establishments in North Dakota
College soccer venues in the United States
Sports venues completed in 1910
Soccer venues in North Dakota
High school football venues in the United States
American football venues in North Dakota